Sixteen was a Polish band, which was founded in 1997 and disbanded in 2004. Renata Dąbkowska is its lead singer, and it represented Poland in the Eurovision Song Contest 1998.

Their debut album "Lawa" (Lava) was released in 1997.

During the later part of 1998, the band became known as Seventeen and sometimes Sixteen-Seventeen.

Sixteen at Eurovision
Sixteen represented Poland in the Eurovision Song Contest 1998. They performed the song "To Takie Proste" in the final of the competition on May 9 in Birmingham, United Kingdom, finishing 17th of 25 entrants.

Group Members

 Renata Dąbkowska - vocals
 Jarosław Pruszkowski - guitar
 Janusz Witaszek - bass guitar
 Tomasz Stryczniewicz - percussion
 Mirosław Hoduń - keyboard

additions for Seventeen:

 Grzegorz Kloc - vocals, guitar
 Olga Pruszkowska - violin, background vocals

External links 
 Poland in Eurovision 1998
 I believe in fate - Interview with Sixteen
 Renata Dąbkowska - official pagein Polish 

Polish pop music groups
Eurovision Song Contest entrants for Poland
Eurovision Song Contest entrants of 1998